Anneline Kriel (born 28 July 1955) is a South African actress, model, and beauty queen. In 1974, Kriel won the Miss South Africa pageant; in the same year, upon the resignation of the Miss World winner, UK's Helen Morgan, Kriel was announced as the winner. She is the second South African to hold the Miss World title after Penelope Coelen in 1958. Since then, she has worked as a model, and actress.

Early life and education 
Kriel was born in Pretoria of an Afrikaner family and raised in the mining town of Witbank, the daughter of a prison officer. Kriel and her two siblings completed their education at Hoërskool Generaal Hertzog.

As a student, Kriel lived in Huis Asterhof (formerly Vergeet-my-nie) while studying drama at the University of Pretoria. While at university, she was crowned the Rag Queen and won the Miss Northern Transvaal pageant. During this time, Kriel appeared in the film "Somer" and an Afrikaans television drama entitled "Storieboekmoord."

Career
In 1974, at age nineteen, Kriel won the Miss South Africa title. She was awarded the Miss World title that same year, after initially being the first runner-up, as Helen Morgan of the UK stepped down. The international media criticised Kriel by depicting her as the face of the apartheid government. In support of the anti-apartheid boycott, the United Kingdom and Australia refused to accept Kriel as part of the obligatory world tour of the Miss World pageant.

Welsh singer Shirley Bassey, a contest judge, also protested against Kriel receiving the award. However, the United States later relented, and Kriel was allowed to make television appearances in the country. In South Africa, her victory at the contest received a positive response from the public and local media.[1]

Upon finishing her term as Miss World, Kriel worked as a model.

In March 1976, Kriel's nude photographs, taken by Roy Hilligenn, were leaked to the media and appeared on the front page of the Sunday Times. It is alleged Hilligenn sold the images to a British newspaper. 

Kriel worked in Italy for five years as the Birra Peroni model in television and magazine advertisements. She also worked as a model in Paris and New York with the Johnny Casablanca Model Management Agency. 

Kriel became an ambassador for several beauty brands, completed public relations activities, and studied drama at the University of Pretoria.[1] She has also starred in several Afrikaans-language films, soap operas, stage plays[2], and the internationally successful film, Kill and Kill Again, which debuted at number two at the US Box Office.[3]

In 1981, Kriel released the pop single "He Took Off My Romeos."

In 2017, the Krugerrand-studded dress that Kriel wore as her national costume in the 1974 Miss World pageant was put on public display in the exhibition at the Prins & Prins Diamonds Museum of Gems and Jewellery in Cape Town. In 2018, Kriel added another evening gown that she wore on the evening of the 1974 Miss World Pageant to the exhibition.

In 2018, Kriel attended the 60th-anniversary celebration of the Miss South African pageant in Pretoria.

On 7 September 2019, Kriel was a guest speaker at the annual upgrade of the Witkruis monument between Mokopane (Potgietersrus) and Polokwane (Pietersburg) in South Africa.

She has appeared on the cover of the South African Huisgenoot magazine 33 times.

Personal life

Kriel learned to speak a little French and Italian from working in France and Italy.

She returned to South Africa from New York to marry Sol Kerzner in 1980. They divorced five years later. Kriel converted to Judaism in Switzerland under the supervision of Rabbi Mordechai Piron (then the rabbi of the Israelitische Cultusgemeinde Zürich (ICZ), the largest Jewish congregation in Switzerland.) Later in 1989, she married the millionaire horse breeder Philip Tucker in Johannesburg, where they resided; the couple had two children, Tayla and Witney. They divorced five years later, in 1994.

On 28 March 1996, Kriel married Peter Bacon, Sol Kerzner's CEO and former protegé. The couple currently resides in Mauritius.

Kriel and Sol Kerzner sought an interdict against Jonathan Ball Publishers Ltd. and Allan Breenblo over Breenblo's Kerzner Unauthorised, the unauthorised biography of Kerzner. They claimed that the content would infringe on their reputations.

In 2007, Kriel, a Goldin family friend, attended the murder trials for the killers of actor Brett Goldin and fashion designer Richard Bloom.

In 2017, Kriel suggested that then President of South Africa, Jacob Zuma should face charges of crimes against humanity in the International Criminal Court for failing to protect farmers in South Africa.

Filmography

References

External links

 Who's who-Anneline Kriel
 YouTube:  https://www.youtube.com/channel/UCJNCKzM3VvGqt-djy3Wy7Sw
 
 Anneline Kriel Page on Facebook : https://www.facebook.com/AnnelineKrielBacon/?ref=bookmarks
 Anneline Kriel Instagram:  https://www.instagram.com/missworld1974_annelinekriel/
 Anneline Kriel Twitter:  https://twitter.com/AnnelinePage

1955 births
Living people
People from Witbank
South African female models
South African film actresses
South African soap opera actresses
Miss World winners
Miss World 1974 delegates
Miss South Africa winners
South African beauty pageant winners
Converts to Judaism
University of Pretoria alumni
Afrikaner Jews
South African people of German descent
South African Jews